Sexual health refers to Reproductive health. It may also refer to:
Sexual Health (journal)
International Journal of Sexual Health